Tom Curtain is an Australian country music singer, songwriter and tourist operator based in Katherine in the Northern Territory.

Career 
Curtain was born in Mildura, Victoria in 1979 before returned his family property Old Boyneside, Kumbia near Kingaroy in Queensland where he attended Kumbia State School. He boarded at Marist College in Brisbane before attending the University of Queensland.

Curtain worked at cattle stations across northern Australia but attributes the beginning of his song-writing to his time working in the stock-camp of Mount Sanford Station in Western Australia.

He began a tourism business in Katherine in 2013, that he runs with his wife Annabel. He is well known for performing while riding a horse.

Curtain has released four albums and toured widely, performing with Sara Storer, The Sunny Cowgirls, Pete Denahy and the Davidson Brothers.

Curtain was close friends with Amy ‘Dolly’ Everett and her family, a local teenager who died by suicide after being bullied. This inspired him to write Speak Up, a duet with Sara Storer which reached No. 1 on the iTunes Country Music Chart.

Discography

Studio albums

Awards

Country Music Awards (CMAA) 
Curtain has won several Golden guitar awards at the Tamworth Country Music Awards of Australia.

|-
| rowspan=2| 2018 || Never Never Land featuring Luke O'Shea || |Toyota Heritage Song of the Year  || 
|-
| Never Never Land featuring Luke O'Shea || Video Clip of the Year || 
|-
| 2021 || "She Gave Us the Song" (with Lee Kernaghan & Sara Storer) || Toyota Heritage Song of the Year  ||

NT Song Of The Year Awards 

|-
| 2018 || Territory Time || Tourism NT Tourism Song Of The Year ||

Southern Stars Australian Independent Country Music Awards 

|-
| rowspan=4| 2018 || himself || Independent Male Artist of the Year || 
|-
| Never Never Land featuring Luke O'Shea || Single of the Year || 
|-
| Territory Time|| Album of the Year || 
|-
|  himself || Independent Artist of the Year ||

Adelaide River Country Music Festival 

|-
| 2002 || himself || Best Male Vocal category ||

References

External links 

 Official website

Living people
Australian country musicians
1979 births